Akkerman may refer to:

Places
 Bilhorod-Dnistrovskyi, a city in Ukraine
 Akkerman Oblast, a region in Ukraine
Akerman Fortress; see Tyras

Other uses
 Akkerman (surname)
 Akkerman Inc., a construction equipment manufacturer in Brownsdale, Minnesota, U.S.

See also
 Akkerman Convention
 Ackerman (disambiguation)
 Ackermann (disambiguation)
 Akerman
 Åkerman
 Ackermans (disambiguation)